Vanderwulpia is a genus of bristle flies in the family Tachinidae. There are at least two described species in Vanderwulpia.

Species
Vanderwulpia atrophopodoides Townsend, 1891
Vanderwulpia sequens Townsend, 1892
Vanderwulpia sororcula (Reinhard, 1975)

References

Tachininae
Taxa named by Charles Henry Tyler Townsend
Diptera of North America